Go On is an American television sitcom created by Scott Silveri, that aired on NBC from August 8, 2012, to April 11, 2013. The series starred Matthew Perry as Ryan King, a sports talk radio host trying to move on from the death of his wife. It was given a series order on April 20, 2012. A preview episode aired following the Olympics coverage on August 8. The series premiered on September 11, 2012, in its normal Tuesday timeslot at 9:00 pm Eastern/8:00 pm Central after The Voice.

On April 20, 2012, NBC ordered a full season of Go On to contain 22 episodes, ahead of the series premiere. On May 10, 2013, NBC cancelled the series after one season.

Cast and characters

Main cast
 Matthew Perry as Ryan King, a sports talk radio host who joins a support group while trying to move on from his late wife's death.
 Laura Benanti as Lauren Bennett, the group's poorly trained leader. She fancies herself "in charge" of the group's emotional well-being.
 Julie White as Anne, a lesbian prosecutor coping with the death of her partner, and stuck in the "anger" stage of grief.
 Suzy Nakamura as Yolanda Mitsawa, an anesthesiologist whose fiancé left her, and who feels that everything is "too sexual", including jazz and cats that continuously rub against her.
 Tyler James Williams as Owen Lewis, whose brother is in a coma following a skiing accident. He is extremely shy in the beginning, though he has come out of his shell quite a bit since Ryan has joined the group.
 Brett Gelman as "Mr. K.", a mysterious member whose first name is Benjamin and who designed NASA's Mars Curiosity rover's sampling arm, coping with grief that the others are too afraid to ask him about.
 Sarah Baker as Sonia (episode 14 onwards; previously recurring), a member of the group, who is grieving over the death of her cat, Cinderella.
 John Cho as Steven, Ryan's boss and best friend, who forces him to seek counseling.

Recurring cast
 Allison Miller as Carrie, Ryan's assistant, who has a crush on Ryan. The penultimate episode of the series reveals that these feelings are mutual, and Carrie quits her job so that she and Ryan are free to carry out a relationship.
 Tonita Castro as Fausta, a member of the group, who is grieving the death of her father and brother.
 Seth Morris as Danny, a member of the group, a discharged soldier whose wife had a son with another man while he was on deployment. 
 Bill Cobbs as George, a member of the group who is blind. 
 Christine Woods as Janie King, Ryan's deceased wife who died in a car crash due to texting while driving.
 Hayes MacArthur as Wyatt Achenbach, Lauren's chiropractor fiancé.
 Piper Perabo as Simone, a popular, former member of the support group, who was dealing with an injury that made her unable to work in her dancing career. She is disliked by Lauren, and develops a romantic relationship with Ryan.
 Terrell Owens as himself. In the first episode, he was Ryan's first guest after he returned from his bereavement leave. In later episodes, he became Ryan's assistant at KBAL.

Episodes

Development and production
NBC ordered Go On to pilot in January 2012.  Matthew Perry was announced as the series' lead actor on March 1. Creator Scott Silveri, who worked with Perry on Friends, claims he subconsciously wrote the part for him.

On April 20, 2012, the pilot became the first of the 2012–13 American television season to gain a series order of thirteen episodes.  Go On aired its pilot on August 8, 2012, during the 2012 Summer Olympics, as a "sneak preview", and was picked up for a full season of twenty-two episodes, on October 2, 2012. Episode eight was originally scheduled for October 30, 2012, but was pre-empted by coverage of Hurricane Sandy. The last two episodes were aired on Thursday unlike the other episodes which aired on Tuesday.

Reception

Critical
The series has received favorable reviews from critics. It holds a Metacritic score of 66/100, indicating "generally favorable" reviews.
Verne Gay of Newsday gave the show a 5 star rating, noting, "The cast is good, even excellent. But Perry's the one who sells Go On." David Hinckley of the New York Daily News described the show as "Maybe the best new sitcom of the fall."
Hank Stuever of the Washington Post praised the directing of the show, observing, "Go On moves quite breezily--much like an NBC-flavored take on premium cable dramadies such as The Big C and Enlightened. It's not as good as either of those, but it has the same happy-sad aura, with just a dash of Community-like absurdity to keep the speed limit up."

Several critics mentioned the show's resemblance to fellow NBC sitcom Community. Emily VanDerWerff of The A.V. Club said, "The show's weird similarities to Community distract". Alan Sepinwall of Hitfix called the show "Community with Chandler Bing instead of the guy from The Soup." James Poniewozik of Time described its premise as being "as much as possible like Community'''s without actually being Community".

Ratings

Release

 Broadcast 
The series aired NBC in the U.S. and was simulcast on Global in Canada.

 Home media Go On'' is available to stream for free on the NBC website and Roku Channel. It is also on video on demand through YouTube, Google Play, Apple TV, Vudu, and Amazon Prime Video.

References

External links

2012 American television series debuts
2013 American television series endings
2010s American LGBT-related comedy television series
2010s American single-camera sitcoms
English-language television shows
NBC original programming
Television series about widowhood
Television series by Universal Television
Television shows set in Los Angeles